

C08C Selective calcium channel blockers with mainly vascular effects

C08CA Dihydropyridine derivatives
C08CA01 Amlodipine
C08CA02 Felodipine
C08CA03 Isradipine
C08CA04 Nicardipine
C08CA05 Nifedipine
C08CA06 Nimodipine
C08CA07 Nisoldipine
C08CA08 Nitrendipine
C08CA09 Lacidipine
C08CA10 Nilvadipine
C08CA11 Manidipine
C08CA12 Barnidipine
C08CA13 Lercanidipine
C08CA14 Cilnidipine
C08CA15 Benidipine
C08CA16 Clevidipine
C08CA17 Levamlodipine
C08CA51 Amlodipine and celecoxib
C08CA55 Nifedipine, combinations

C08CX Other selective calcium channel blockers with mainly vascular effects
C08CX01 Mibefradil

C08D Selective calcium channel blockers with direct cardiac effects

C08DA Phenylalkylamine derivatives
C08DA01 Verapamil
C08DA02 Gallopamil
C08DA51 Verapamil, combinations

C08DB Benzothiazepine derivatives
C08DB01 Diltiazem

C08E Non-selective calcium channel blockers

C08EA Phenylalkylamine derivatives
C08EA01 Fendiline
C08EA02 Bepridil

C08EX Other non-selective calcium channel blockers
C08EX01 Lidoflazine
C08EX02 Perhexiline

C08G Calcium channel blockers and diuretics

C08GA Calcium channel blockers and diuretics
C08GA01 Nifedipine and diuretics
C08GA02 Amlodipine and diuretics

References

C08